David Clelland (18 March 1924 – 8 June 2004) was a Scottish professional footballer who played as an outside right in the Football League for Brighton & Hove Albion, Crystal Palace and Scunthorpe United. He was on the books of Arsenal and Ipswich Town without playing for their first team, and scored 11 goals from 26 appearances in all competitions for Southern League club Weymouth.

After retiring from football in 1951, Clelland served in the Metropolitan Police. He died in Whitburn, Tyne and Wear in 2004 at the age of 80.

References

1924 births
2004 deaths
Footballers from South Lanarkshire
Scottish footballers
Association football outside forwards
Arsenal F.C. players
Brighton & Hove Albion F.C. players
Ipswich Town F.C. players
Crystal Palace F.C. players
Weymouth F.C. players
Scunthorpe United F.C. players
English Football League players
Southern Football League players